Guillermo Galván Galván (born January 19, 1943) is a Mexican general. He formerly served as  secretary of National Defense for the government of Felipe Calderon. He was succeeded 1 December 2012 by Salvador Cienfuegos Zepeda.

He holds a master's degree in security and national defense at the College of National Defense, has obtained a BA in military administration at the School of War and holds a master's degree in electronic engineering from the Monterrey Institute of Technology and Higher Education.

Galván served as military and air defense attaché at the Mexican embassy in Madrid, Spain.  He served as commander of various military zones in the country, including the fifth zone in the state of Chihuahua, the 30th in Tabasco, the 21st in Tabasco and the 17th in Querétaro. Galván has served as assistant operating staff director, as head of the Center for the Coordination of Air Operations of the National Defense Staff, and head of the Fifth Section of the National Defense Staff.  The general also was director and dean of the University of the Mexican Army and Air Force in the Federal District and director of the Military School of Weapons Classes in the state of Puebla.  Galván served as undersecretary of National Defense from March 2004 until his appointment as National Defense Secretary.

See also 
Mexican Executive Cabinet

References

External links 

 Mexico - Presidency of the Republic Website

1943 births
Living people
Mexican Secretaries of Defense
Mexican generals
21st-century Mexican politicians
People from Mexico City